Golesh Bluff is the ice-covered bluff rising to 1426 m on the north side of Detroit Plateau on Trinity Peninsula in Graham Land, Antarctica.  It has precipitous west slopes surmounting a tributary glacier that is flowing northwestwards into Pettus Glacier.

The feature is named after the settlement of Golesh in Northeastern Bulgaria.

Location
German-British mapping in 1996.

Maps
 Trinity Peninsula. Scale 1:250000 topographic map No. 5697. Institut für Angewandte Geodäsie and British Antarctic Survey, 1996.
 Antarctic Digital Database (ADD). Scale 1:250000 topographic map of Antarctica. Scientific Committee on Antarctic Research (SCAR). Since 1993, regularly updated.

Notes

References
 Golesh Bluff. SCAR Composite Antarctic Gazetteer
 Bulgarian Antarctic Gazetteer. Antarctic Place-names Commission. (details in Bulgarian, basic data in English)

External links
 Golesh Bluff. Copernix satellite image

Cliffs of Graham Land
Landforms of Trinity Peninsula
Bulgaria and the Antarctic